Stars on the Wall is the second album from Belgian solo act The Go Find, released in 2007 by Morr Music.

Track listing
"Beautiful Night" (1:54)
"Dictionary" (4:04)
"New Year" (3:12)
"Adrenaline" (4:35)
"Downtown" (2:53)
"Ice Cold Ice" (5:16)
"25 Years" (4:00)
"Monday Morning" (2:40)
"We Don't Wanna" (2:45)
"Everything Is Low" (5:58)
"Kid OK" (4:52)

References

2007 albums
The Go Find albums
Morr Music albums